The Cancioneiro da Vaticana (Vatican Songbook) is a compilation of troubadour lyrics in Galician-Portuguese.  It was discovered c. 1840 in the holdings of the Vatican Library and was first transcribed by D. Caetano Lopes de Moura in 1847, sponsored by the Viscount of Carreira, and again by Ernesto Monaci in 1875.

The songbook contains 228 folios with a total of 1205 lyrics that date from the 13th and 14th centuries. Nearly all the poems belong to the three principal genres of secular cantigas: the cantigas de amigo, cantigas de amor and cantigas de escárnio e maldizer. Even though the texts were meant to be sung, there is no musical notation—nor space left for it (see Cancioneiro da Ajuda).

The Cancioneiro da Vaticana, together with the Cancioneiro da Biblioteca Nacional (kept in Lisbon), were copied from an earlier manuscript (or manuscripts) around 1525, in Rome Italy at the behest of the Italian humanist Angelo Colocci. The two songbooks are either sister manuscripts or cousins.

See also
Cantiga de amigo
Cantigas de Santa Maria
Portuguese literature
Music history of Portugal

References
 Cintra, Luís F. Lindley. 1973. (Introdução) Cancioneiro português da Biblioteca Vaticana (Cód. 4803). Reprodução facsimilada. Lisboa: Centro de Estudos Filológicos & Instituto de Alta Cultura.
 Ferrari, Anna. 1991. “Le Chansonnier et son double”, in Lyrique romane médiévale: la tradition des chansonniers.  Actes du Colloque de Liège, 1989, ed. Madeleine Tyssens,  Bibliothèque de la Faculté de Philosophie et Lettres de l’Université de Liège –  Fascicule CCLVIII. 303-327
 Ferrari, Ana. 1993. “Cancioneiro da Vaticana”, in Lanciani & Tavani 1993: 123–126.
 Gonçalves, Elsa. 1993. “Tradição manuscrita da poesia lírica”, in Lanciani & Tavani 1993: 627–632.
 Lanciani, Giulia & Tavani, Giuseppe (org.). 1993. Dicionário da Literatura Medieval Galega e Portuguesa.  Lisboa: Caminho.
 Monaci, Ernesto. 1875. Il canzoniere portoghese della Biblioteca Vaticana, messo a stampa.  Halle a.S.: Max Niemeyer Editore.
(Gal) Pena, Xosé Ramón. 2002. "Historia da literatura medieval galego-portuguesa", Santiago de Compostela, Sotelo Blanco: 107; 112-121

Portuguese music history
Galician-Portuguese
Portuguese literature
Chansonniers (books)